Elena Kazantseva (born 5 December 1956, in Minsk) is a Belarusian poet and singer-songwriter who writes in the Russian language. She recorded five music albums with songs on her own poetry and published two books of her poems, "Night City" (1992) and "Concerto (in two parts)" (2002). She sings and plays the guitar and the piano. In 1988, she won Second All-Union festival of song in Tallinn.

Critics noted that quality of her poetry far exceeds the average level of texts in Russian bard's songs. According to Yuli Kim, "Poetry by Elena Kazantseva is an endless monologue about love. It is composed of lyrical miniatures, a kind of an intimate diary. They are distinguished by a rare quality - a completely natural and unselfish honesty of self-expression. Apparently, all her poetry is about the same, but one can not stop listening. This is like watching fire in camine or looking at running water in a creek."

References

Selected discography
The system of views, Link to CD
To long, long memory
Street princess, Link to CD
Aleshenka rides on a horse cab
Do you remember, the guard, it was summer...

Links
Her website in project ASiA
Her site at golos.de
Her site in bards.ru 
Women's romance, her concert with Sergei Nikitin: Part 1, Part 2, part3, part 4, part 5

Belarusian singer-songwriters
Russian-language writers
Living people
1956 births
Belarusian women poets
20th-century Belarusian poets
Musicians from Minsk
21st-century Belarusian poets
Writers from Minsk
21st-century women writers
20th-century women writers